Phoenix Movies Channel is one of the six channels that Phoenix Television operates. It was launched on August 28, 1998, and serves as an encrypted pay-television service. Currently the encrypted signal is beamed via AsiaSat 3S across China, Vietnam (Via HTVC) and South Korea (Via SBS). In the beginning, it was broadcast via cable in Hong Kong, and via satellite to Taiwan, and other regions worldwide besides the mainland. Due to stiff competition from other Chinese movie channels, the channel was withdrawn from those regions.

The movies are aired in their original language and occasionally comes with Chinese Subtitles (China) and Korean Subtitles (South Korea).

Phoenix Movies Channel showcases Hollywood blockbusters, Chinese top hits as well as international award-winning titles. Over 280 movie titles are shown each month, of which 80% are Asian productions from libraries including Golden Harvest, Golden Princess and Media Asia featuring renowned directors like Wong Kar-wai, Tsui Hark, as well as top artists such as Jackie Chan, Chow Yun-fat, Tony Leung, Maggie Chow, Andy Lau, Stephen Chow, and Leon Lai. 
 
The remaining 20% of the programming comprises Hollywood and international blockbusters. To preserve the originality of the movies, all films are shown in original soundtracks with Chinese subtitles.

Related Channels 
Phoenix Chinese Channel
Phoenix InfoNews Channel
Phoenix Chinese News and Entertainment Channel
Phoenix Hong Kong Channel

External links 
 Phoenix Movies Site in Chinese

Television networks in China
Cable television in Hong Kong
Television channels and stations established in 1998